Joseph Edelman (born 1955) is an American billionaire hedge fund manager. He is the founder and portfolio manager of Perceptive Advisors, a New York City-based hedge fund, founded in 1999.

Biography
Edelman was born to a Jewish family, the son of Isidore Edelman. His father was a renowned scientist who was a professor emeritus of biochemistry and molecular biophysics at Columbia's College of Physicians and Surgeons. He has three siblings: Dr. Arthur Edelman; Susan Edelman Bleckner; and Ann Edelman Korchin.

References

Living people
1950s births
University of California, San Diego alumni
New York University
Businesspeople from New York City
American hedge fund managers
American billionaires
20th-century American Jews
21st-century American Jews